Chandil railway station serves Chandil in Seraikela Kharsawan district in the Indian state of Jharkhand.

History
The Bengal Nagpur Railway was formed in 1887 for the purpose of upgrading the Nagpur Chhattisgarh Railway and then extending it via Bilaspur to Asansol, in order to develop a shorter Howrah–Mumbai route than the one via Allahabad. The Bengal Nagpur Railway main line from Nagpur to Asansol, on the Howrah–Delhi main line, was opened for goods traffic on 1 February 1891.

The Chandil–Barkakana line was opened for traffic in 1927.

Electrification
The Purulia–Chakradharpur, Kandra–Gomharria, Sini–Adityapur, Adityapur–Tatanagar,  Chakradharpur–Manoharpur and Manoharpur–Rourkela sections were electrified in 1961–62.

References

External links
 Trains at Chandil

Chakradharpur railway division
Railway stations in Seraikela Kharsawan district
Railway stations in India opened in 1890